Chase Brice (born January 27, 1998) is an American football quarterback. He played college football at Clemson, Duke, and Appalachian State, winning a national championship with the Tigers.

College career

Clemson 
After redshirting his true freshman season, Brice entered the 2018 season as the third-string quarterback behind Kelly Bryant and Trevor Lawrence. He was bumped up to the backup role when Bryant opted to transfer out after losing the starting job to Lawrence. In his first game as the backup quarterback, he was thrust into game action after Lawrence left with a head injury in the second quarter, helping Clemson rally from a 10-point fourth quarter deficit to a 27–23 comeback win over Syracuse, with the go-ahead score happening on a 12-play, 94-yard drive.
The win kept the then-No. 3 ranked Tigers in contention for a College Football Playoff berth, which they were able to secure as they won their second national championship in three seasons.

Brice spent 2019 as Lawrence's backup before opting to transfer to Duke before the 2020 season, citing the chance to work with Duke coach David Cutcliffe, who has gained a reputation for being one of the top quarterback coaches in football.

Duke 
Brice entered Duke as a graduate transfer after earning a degree in Parks, Recreation, and Tourism Management from Clemson, granting him immediate eligibility. He was named the starting quarterback by Cutcliffe ahead of their season opener against Notre Dame, where he threw for 259 yards and rushed for a touchdown in what was a 27–13 loss for the Blue Devils. He started all 11 of Duke's games in 2020 but struggled with turnovers throughout the season after posting a touchdown-interception ratio of 10–15 as the Blue Devils went 2–9 on the season. Brice announced that he would transfer from Duke, his second transfer in as many seasons.

Appalachian State 
Brice announced that he would transfer to Appalachian State for the 2021 season, enrolling for the spring semester as a graduate student.

Statistics

Professional career
Brice was selected with the third overall pick in the 2023 USFL Draft by the Houston Gamblers.

Personal life

Brice's uncle is Clemson special teams coordinator Mickey Conn.

References

External links 
 
 Appalachian State Mountaineers profile
 Duke Blue Devils profile
 Clemson Tigers profile

1998 births
Living people
People from Gwinnett County, Georgia
Players of American football from Georgia (U.S. state)
American football quarterbacks
Clemson Tigers football players
Duke Blue Devils football players
Appalachian State Mountaineers football players